Matthias Kaburek (9 February 1911 – 17 February 1976) was an Austrian football player.

Club career
Born in Vienna, Kaburek played most of his career at local giants Rapid Wien. He also had a spell at French league sides Metz, alongside compatriot and fellow World Cup player Franz Cisar, and Longwy. For Rapid Vienna, Kaburek played 435 games and scored 520 goals.

International career
As a player Kaburek was part of Austria national football team at the 1934 FIFA World Cup. He also played one match for Germany in 1939.

Honours
Austrian Bundesliga Top Goalscorer (1):
 1935

References

External links
 
 Matthias Kaburek at Rapid Archive
 

1911 births
1976 deaths
Footballers from Vienna
Austrian footballers
Austria international footballers
German footballers
Germany international footballers
Dual internationalists (football)
1934 FIFA World Cup players
SK Rapid Wien players
FC Metz players
Austrian Football Bundesliga players
Ligue 1 players
Austrian expatriate footballers
Expatriate footballers in France
Austrian football managers
Expatriate football managers in Czechoslovakia
Austrian expatriate sportspeople in Czechoslovakia
Austrian expatriate sportspeople in France
FC Zbrojovka Brno managers
Association football forwards